The Corn Belt derecho was a progressive derecho which affected a large area of the central United States on June 29, 1998. In the morning, thunderstorms, including a supercell, developed over South Dakota and tracked into central Iowa.  As the thunderstorms reached central Iowa, a strong rear-inflow jet developed which caused the thunderstorm to take on a different characteristic, becoming a derecho. It traveled more than 600 miles in about ten hours, causing more than $125 million worth of widespread damage destruction, especially to crops, and was responsible for power outages to nearly a half a million people.

Meteorological synopsis
At 1200 UTC (7:00 am. CDT), a stationary front extended from South Dakota to Southern Michigan, bringing warm and humid to its South. At 850 mb, the southwesterly flow was maintaining this situation while at higher levels the flow was turning to the northwest, bringing drier and colder air. Daytime heating would increase the instability of the airmass and the CAPE was expected to reach a strong 3689 J/kg. At the same time, there was relatively weak synoptic-scale forcing, the surface flow being a barometric col.

Along the front in South Dakota, an unorganized area of thunderstorms formed by 9:00 a.m. CDT. They rapidly organized and spread along the front, moving east-southeast into northeast Nebraska. By midday, the storms reached northwestern and north central Iowa, supercells among them, while forming a west–east band and assuming a bow echo shape.

In the early afternoon, a second area of thunderstorms formed west of Des Moines and merged with the original bow echo line which accelerating east-southeast into Illinois by 4:00 p.m. The line evolved into a classic large scale bow echo, showing a "book end vortex" on its northern end, becoming a progressive derecho. Damage, especially to crops and trees, became continuous from the Iowa border into Indiana as most of the damage was produced by strong straight-line winds on the leading edge of the gust front. Some embedded supercells, showing smaller-scale vortices on radars, produced narrower corridors of more intense damage, with measured wind gusts up to at least .

The derecho crossed central and southern Indiana during the early to mid evening while its highest wind gusts decreased somewhat compared with those observed earlier in the day. The system became a roughly west–east arc and turned more southward as it moved into Kentucky by late evening, dissipating gradually

Impact

By the end of the morning, the thunderstorms produced hail up to the size of hen's eggs and locally damaging wind in Nebraska. By mid-day, supercells along the bow echo in Iowa began to produce very strong winds, up to tennis ball-sized hail, and several mostly short-lived tornadoes. On Doppler weather radar, a large fast-moving mesocyclone associated of the track of a supercell was nearly in contact with the ground as it moved from southwest Boone County east-southeast across the northern and eastern parts of the Des Moines metro area.

Over the Davenport, Iowa NWS Weather Office area of responsibility, numerous reports of wind gusts ranging from 80 to 100 mph were received. This was the highest unofficial recorded wind gust in the history of the state of Iowa until the August 2020 Midwest derecho. At the same moment, the area of green in the radar display to the right shows the velocities toward the weather radar. The lighter shade, beneath the orange arrow, represented Doppler-estimated mean wind speeds in excess of  all along the gust front, and the yellow circle are mesocyclone detections.

In Illinois, railroad cars were toppled, steel power transmission towers were bent, and many buildings were seriously damaged during the afternoon. By the evening into Indiana, hundreds of trees were uprooted in the Bedford and Indianapolis areas, two semi-trailer trucks were blown off Interstate 65 near Columbus. By late evening, damage into Kentucky was minimal, mostly limited to toppled trees and several blown off roofs.

Along with the long-lived derecho, 20 tornadoes were reported, one of which was an F2 tornado, injuring 85 people in central Iowa.  Over eight states, the derecho and associated tornadoes killed one person and injured 174.

See also 
 List of derecho events
 Tornadoes of 1998
 August 2020 Midwest derecho

References

External links 
  Storm Prediction Center's 'About Derechos' web page summary of the event by Stephen Corfidi  
 NWS Quad Cities overview

Copy from the above referenced website.

F2 tornadoes
Tornadoes of 1998
Derechos in the United States
1998 natural disasters in the United States
1998 meteorology
Natural disasters in Iowa
June 1998 events in the United States